The kurzer 8 cm Granatwerfer 42 (kz 8 cm GrW 42) was a mortar used by Germany during World War II. It was developed as a lightened version of the standard German 8 cm GrW 34 medium mortar with a shorter barrel for use by paratroopers, but replaced the ineffective 5 cm leGrW 36 as that weapon's shortcomings became apparent. The kz 8 cm GrW 42 fired a bomb over 3 and a half times heavier twice as far as the smaller mortar, but was less than twice as heavy. It broke down into the standard three loads for transport.

Some weapons were provided with a lanyard-operated loading/firing mechanism for remote-controlled use. It was generally known as the "Stummelwerfer" or "Stump-Thrower".

References 

 Gander, Terry and Chamberlain, Peter. Weapons of the Third Reich: An Encyclopedic Survey of All Small Arms, Artillery and Special Weapons of the German Land Forces 1939-1945. New York: Doubleday, 1979

External links
 German Infantry Mortars

World War II infantry mortars of Germany
81mm mortars
Rheinmetall
Weapons and ammunition introduced in 1941